Dean Sayers (born 11 June 1954) is an Australian cricketer. He played in three first-class matches for South Australia in 1981 and 1982.

See also
 List of South Australian representative cricketers

References

External links
 

1954 births
Living people
Australian cricketers
South Australia cricketers
Cricketers from Adelaide